Pele is a masculine given name, surname and nickname. 

Variant forms include Pelé and Pellè.

People with this nickname or professional name
Male
Pelé (1940–2022), Brazilian footballer
Pelé (footballer, born 1973), Macanese football midfielder of São Toméan descent
Pelé (footballer, born 1978), Cape Verdean-Portuguese football defender
Pelé (footballer, born 1987), Portuguese football midfielder
Pelé (footballer, born 1991), Portuguese football midfielder of Guinea-Bissau descent
Female
Pele de Lappe (1916–2007), American social realist artist

People with this given name
Pele Koljonen (born 1988), Finnish footballer
Pele Paelay (born 1984), American basketball player
Pelé Reid (born 1973), British boxer

People with this surname
Abédi Pelé (born Abédi Ayew in 1964), Ghanaian international football captain
Bryan Pelé (born 1992), French football defender
Eric Pele (born 1969), American mixed martial artist and tattoo artist
Graziano Pellè (born 1985), Italian football forward
Maurice Pelé (1928–2021), French cyclist
Steven Pelé (born 1981), French football goalkeeper
Yohann Pelé (born 1982), French football goalkeeper

See also
Pelle (given name)
Pelle (surname)
Peele, surname

See also
Pele (disambiguation)